A transgranular fracture is a fracture that follows the edges of lattices in a granular material, ignoring the grains in the individual lattices.  This results in a fairly smooth looking fracture with fewer sharp edges than one that follows the changing grains. This can be visualized as several wooden jigsaw puzzle pieces with the grains showing, but with each piece having grains running in a different direction. A transgranular fracture follows the grains in the wood, not the edges of the puzzle pieces. This is opposed to an intergranular fracture.

References

Granularity of materials
Fracture mechanics